Commodore Perry may refer to:
 Commodore Matthew Perry (1794–1858), United States Navy officer
 Commodore Oliver Hazard Perry (1785–1819), United States Navy officer
 Commodore Perry Owens (1852–1919), American gunfighter
 USS Commodore Perry (1859), a United States Navy steamship
 Lyman Perry (1897–1975), United States Navy officer with rank of commodore and All-American football player